Gordon Barker was an association football player who represented New Zealand at international level.

Barker made a solitary official international appearance for New Zealand in a 2–1 win over Australia on 14 August 1954.

References

Year of birth missing
Year of death missing
New Zealand association footballers
New Zealand international footballers
Association football wingers